The 2018 Conference USA women's basketball tournament was a postseason women's basketball tournament for the Conference USA held at The Ford Center at The Star in Frisco, Texas, from March 7 through March 10, 2018. Western Kentucky won their 3rd Conference USA tournament earns an automatic bid to the 2018 NCAA Women's Division I Basketball Tournament.

Seeds
The top twelve teams will qualify for the tournament. Teams will be seeded by record within the conference, with a tiebreaker system to seed teams with identical conference records.

Schedule

Bracket

All times listed are Central

See also
2018 Conference USA men's basketball tournament

References

Conference USA women's basketball tournament
Conference USA women's basketball tournament
tournament
Conference USA women's basketball tournament